Neobostra, is a monotypic snout moth genus described by George Hampson in 1906. Its only species, Neobostra ferruginealis, described by the same author in the same year, is found in South Africa.

References

Endemic moths of South Africa
Moths described in 1906
Pyralinae
Monotypic moth genera
Moths of Africa
Pyralidae genera